Belarus competed at the 2004 Summer Paralympics in Athens, Greece. The team included 33 athletes, 20 men and 13 women. Competitors from Belarus won 29 medals, including 10 gold, 12 silver and 7 bronze to finish 19th in the medal table.

Medallists

Sports

Archery

|-
|align=left|Tatsiana Hryshko
|align=left|Women's individual standing
|497
|16
|N/A
|L 113-145
|colspan=4|did not advance
|}

Athletics

Men's track

Men's field

Women's track

Women's field

Cycling

Men's road

Men's track

Women's road

Women's track

Powerlifting

Men

Women

Swimming

Men

Women

See also
Belarus at the Paralympics
Belarus at the 2004 Summer Olympics

References 

Nations at the 2004 Summer Paralympics
2004
Summer Paralympics